The third season of Burmese competitive reality TV cooking show MasterChef Myanmar ran from September 20, 2020 to January 31, 2021 on MRTV-4. Hsu Mon Hnin was the winner of this season. The host of this season was Thazin Nwe Win and the judges were Jean Marc Lemmery, U Ye Htut Win and Daw Phyu Phyu Tin. Henri Delorme was guest judge of this season.

Top 20

References

Burmese television series
MasterChef
MasterChef Myanmar